The Grünhornlücke (el. 3280 m.) is a high mountain pass in the eastern Bernese Alps, connecting the Aletsch Glacier and the Fiescher Glacier in the canton of Valais. The pass is located between the Grünhorn on the north and the Fiescher Gabelhorn on the south.

On the west side of the pass (Aletsch Glacier) is the Konkordiaplatz. The Grünhornlücke is approximately halfway between the Konkordia Hut and the Finsteraarhorn Hut.

See also
List of mountain passes in Switzerland

References

Mountain passes of Valais
Mountain passes of the Alps